Calletaera is a genus of moths in the family Geometridae.

Species
 Calletaera foveata Holloway, 1993
 Calletaera jotaria (Felder & Rogenhofer, 1875)
 Calletaera postvittata (Walker, 1861)
 Calletaera schistacea (Swinhoe, 1900)
 Calletaera subexpressa (Walker, 1861)
 Calletaera subgravata (Prout, 1932)

References
 Calletaera at Markku Savela's Lepidoptera and Some Other Life Forms
 Natural History Museum Lepidoptera genus database

Ennominae
Geometridae genera